"You Are the Music in Me" is the second single released in the UK from the Disney Channel Original Movie, High School Musical 2.

Original version

Music video
The music video is just the clip that was in the movie that featured the song, but in a different edit. There is no new music video was made for it but the clip taken from the movie was used for promotion. It begins with Kelsi, Gabriella, and Troy singing at the piano that ends with some of the other cast coming in and singing along and clips from the first movie (High School Musical) featuring Gabriella and Troy are inserted in.

Charts

Track listing
UK CD single
"You Are the Music in Me" (Zac Efron and Vanessa Hudgens)
"You Are the Music in Me" (Instrumental)

Sharpay version

A version sung by the character Sharpay appears as an additional track and is  called as "You Are the Music In Me (Sharpay Version) or (Reprise)" is the sixth song for the soundtrack album for the Disney Channel Original Movie of the same name.

Song information
This song is "You Are the Music In Me" in a more-upbeat version. Sharpay takes this song from Gabriella and Troy when she tricks Troy into singing with her in the talent show. The song contains instruments, including piano, drums and guitars.

The song was used in the movie High School Musical 2 in the scene when Troy and Gabriella's relationship is exhausted when Troy sees Ryan with Gabriella, causing jealousy. Giving to a "promise" from Troy, he and Sharpay practice their song for the Midsummer Night's Talent Show. Amazon's editors stated that "The song "You Are the Music in Me" is a fine one and doesn't get bogged down in syrup. It also gets reprised by Troy and Sharpay in a rockier and arguably better version."

It was supposed to be sung at the Midsummer Night's Talent Show but since Sharpay was unable to come on stage due to absence and Troy on his own, the song never got sung.

Official versions
"You Are the Music in Me (Sharpay Version)" (Album Version) — 2:29
"You Are the Music in Me (Sharpay Version)" (Instrumental Version) — 2:29
"You Are the Music in Me (Sharpay Version)" (Jason Nevins Non-Stop Dance Remix) — 3:31

Charts

Other versions

Malaysian version
The Malaysian Version was sung by Vince Chong and Jaclyn Victor.

Spanish versions
Disney Latinoamérica released two versions of the song in Spanish.

Mexican version
The Mexican Version was sung by Paulina Holgiun and Roger Gonzalez.

Ríoplatense version
Aside from the one released for the Mexican audience, Disney Latinoamérica also released a version for Argentine and Colombian markets. The version was sung by Dani Martin and Valeria Gastaldi.

Molly Sandén and Ola Svensson version

Molly Sandén and Ola Svensson released a Swedish language version of the song entitled "Du är musiken i mig" that reached number 21 in the Swedish Singles Chart and stayed on the chart for a total of 16 weeks.

References

2007 songs
Songs from High School Musical (franchise)
Ashley Tisdale songs
Vanessa Hudgens songs
Zac Efron songs
Pop ballads
Walt Disney Records singles
Songs written by Jamie Houston (songwriter)
2000s ballads
Male–female vocal duets